UISD may refer to:

 United Independent School District
 Utopia Independent School District